Arthrosaura versteegii is a species of lizard in the family Gymnophthalmidae. The species is indigenous to northeastern South America.

Etymology
The specific name, versteegii, is in honor of Gerard Martinus Versteeg (1876–1943), who was a Dutch physician and explorer.

Geographic range
A. versteegii is found in Brazil (Amazonas), French Guiana, Suriname, and Venezuela.

Habitat

Reproduction
A. versteegii is oviparous.

References

Further reading
Ávila-Pires TCS, Hoogmoed MS, Silva MB (2018). "First records in Brazil for Arthrosaura versteegii van Lidth de Jeude, 1904 (Reptilia, Gymnophthalmidae), a possible species complex, and distribution extension for Arthrosaura montigena Myers & Donnelly, 2008, in Venezuela". Check List 14 (4): 569–577.
Hoogmoed MS, Ávila-Pires TCS (1992). "Studies on the species of the South American lizard genus Arthrosaura Boulenger (Reptilia: Sauria: Teiidae), with the resurrection of two species [A. versteegii, Pantodactylus tyleri ]". Zoologische Mededelingen 66: 453–484.
Lidth de Jeude TW (1904). "Reptiles and Batrachians from Surinam". Notes from the Leyden Museum 25: 83–94 + Plate 7. (Arthrosaura versteegii, new species, pp. 89–91 + Plate 7, figures 5–6).

Arthrosaura
Reptiles described in 1904
Taxa named by Theodorus Willem van Lidth de Jeude